Luciano Pavarotti  (12 October 19356 September 2007) was an Italian operatic tenor who during the late part of his career crossed over into popular music, eventually becoming one of the most acclaimed tenors of all time. He made numerous recordings of complete operas and individual arias, gaining worldwide fame for his tone, and gaining the nickname "King of the High Cs".

As one of the Three Tenors, who performed their first concert during the 1990 FIFA World Cup before a global audience, Pavarotti became well known for his televised concerts and media appearances. From the beginning of his professional career as a tenor in 1961 in Italy to his final performance of "Nessun dorma" at the 2006 Winter Olympics in Turin, Pavarotti was at his best in bel canto operas, pre-Aida Verdi roles, and Puccini works such as La bohème, Tosca, Turandot and Madama Butterfly. He sold over 100 million records, and the first Three Tenors recording became the best-selling classical album of all time. Pavarotti was also noted for his charity work on behalf of refugees and the Red Cross, amongst others. He died from pancreatic cancer on 6 September 2007.

Biography

Early life and musical training
Luciano Pavarotti was born in 1935 on the outskirts of Modena in Northern Italy, the son of Fernando Pavarotti, a baker and amateur tenor, and Adele Venturi, a cigar factory worker. Although he spoke fondly of his childhood, the family had little money; its four members were crowded into a two-room apartment. According to Pavarotti, his father had a fine tenor voice but rejected the possibility of a singing career because of nervousness. World War II forced the family out of the city in 1943. For the following year they rented a single room from a farmer in the neighbouring countryside, where the young Pavarotti developed an interest in farming.

After abandoning the dream of becoming a football goalkeeper, Pavarotti spent seven years in vocal training. Pavarotti's earliest musical influences were his father's records, most of them featuring the popular tenors of the day—Beniamino Gigli, Giovanni Martinelli, Tito Schipa, and Enrico Caruso. Pavarotti's favourite tenor and idol was Giuseppe Di Stefano and he was also deeply influenced by Mario Lanza, saying: "In my teens I used to go to Mario Lanza movies and then come home and imitate him in the mirror". At around the age of nine he began singing with his father in a small local church choir.

In addition to music, as a child Pavarotti enjoyed playing football. When he graduated from the Scuola Magistrale he was interested in pursuing a career as a professional football goalkeeper, but his mother convinced him to train as a teacher. He subsequently taught in an elementary school for two years but finally decided to pursue a music career. His father, recognising the risk involved, only reluctantly gave his consent. Pavarotti began the serious study of music in 1954 at the age of 19 with Arrigo Pola, a respected teacher and professional tenor in Modena who offered to teach him without remuneration. According to conductor Richard Bonynge, Pavarotti never learned to read music.

In 1955, he experienced his first singing success when he was a member of the Corale Rossini, a male voice choir from Modena that also included his father, which won first prize at the International Eisteddfod in Llangollen, Wales. He later said that this was the most important experience of his life, and that it inspired him to become a professional singer. At about this time Pavarotti first met Adua Veroni. They married in 1961. When his teacher Arrigo Pola moved to Japan, Pavarotti became a student of Ettore Campogalliani, who at that time was also teaching Pavarotti's childhood friend, Mirella Freni, whose mother worked with Luciano's mother in the cigar factory. Like Pavarotti, Freni went on to become a successful opera singer; they would go on to collaborate in various stage performances and recordings together.

During his years of musical study, Pavarotti held part-time jobs in order to sustain himself—first as an elementary school teacher and then as an insurance salesman. The first six years of study resulted in only a few recitals, all in small towns and without pay. When a nodule developed on his vocal cords, causing a "disastrous" concert in Ferrara, he decided to give up singing. Pavarotti attributed his immediate improvement to the psychological release connected with this decision. Whatever the reason, the nodule not only disappeared but, as he related in his autobiography: "Everything I had learned came together with my natural voice to make the sound I had been struggling so hard to achieve".

Career: 1960s–1970s
Pavarotti began his career as a tenor in smaller regional Italian opera houses, making his debut as Rodolfo in La bohème at the Teatro Municipale in Reggio Emilia in April 1961.  His first known recording of "Che gelida manina" was recorded during this performance. Pavarotti's first of two marriages was to Adua Veroni which lasted from 1961 to 2000 and they had three daughters: Lorenza, Cristina, and Giuliana.

He made his first international appearance in La traviata in Belgrade, Yugoslavia. Very early in his career, on 23 February 1963, he debuted at the Vienna State Opera in the same role. In March and April 1963 Vienna saw Pavarotti again as Rodolfo and as Duca di Mantova in Rigoletto. The same year saw his first concert outside Italy when he sang in Dundalk, Ireland for the St Cecilia's Gramophone Society, he was engaged by the Dublin Grand Opera Society to sing The Duke of Mantua in Verdi's Rigoletto in May and June, and his Royal Opera House debut, where he replaced an indisposed Giuseppe Di Stefano as Rodolfo.

There exist on archive.org three complete performances from Pavarotti's early career in 1964, when he was engaged by the Dublin Grand Opera Society to sing Rudolfo in Giacomo Puccini's La bohème  (Audio recording of LA BOHEME Presented on May 19, 21, 27, Jun 1 1964 at the Gaiety Theatre Dublin as part of the Dublin Grand Opera Society’s Spring Season) and Alfredo in Giuseppe Verdi's La Traviata  (Audio recording of LA TRAVIATA Presented on Jun 8 1964 at the Gaiety Theatre Dublin as part of the Dublin Grand Opera Society's Spring Season, Audio recording of LA TRAVIATA Presented on May 25, 1964 at the Gaiety Theatre Dublin as part of the Dublin Grand Opera Society's Spring Season). Also available are reviews of those performances in which the reviewers favorably comment on his singing (from the reviews for "La Boheme"): "sang sweetly and appealingly," "rich promise," "outstanding," "fit for the big heroic roles," and "robust;" his voice: "pure tone", "arresting quality," "unforced strength and range," "well sustained," and "lovely;" and his acting: "looked and moved well," "sang with musically-directed intelligence," "used the voice to reinforce his acting," and "chief delight of the evening."

While generally successful, Pavarotti's early roles did not immediately propel him into the stardom that he would later enjoy. An early coup involved his connection with Joan Sutherland (and her conductor husband, Richard Bonynge), who in 1963 was seeking a tenor taller than herself to take along on her 1965 tour to Australia. With his commanding physical presence, Pavarotti proved ideal. However, before the summer 1965 Australia tour Pavarotti sang with Joan Sutherland when he made his American début with the Greater Miami Opera in February 1965, singing in Donizetti's Lucia di Lammermoor on the stage of the Miami-Dade County Auditorium in Miami. The tenor scheduled to perform that night became ill with no understudy. As Sutherland had plans to travel with him on the Australia tour that summer, she recommended the young Pavarotti as he was acquainted with the role. Shortly after, on 28 April, Pavarotti made his La Scala debut in the revival of the Franco Zeffirelli production of La bohème, with his childhood friend Mirella Freni singing Mimi and Herbert von Karajan conducting. Karajan had requested the singer's engagement.

During the Australia tour in summer 1965 Sutherland and Pavarotti sang some forty performances over two months, and Pavarotti later credited Sutherland for the breathing technique that would sustain him over his career. After the extended Australian tour, he returned to La Scala, where he added Tebaldo from I Capuleti e i Montecchi to his repertoire on 26 March 1966, with Giacomo Aragall as Romeo. His first appearance as Tonio in Donizetti's La fille du régiment took place at the Royal Opera House, Covent Garden, on 2 June of that year. It was his performances of this role that would earn him the title of "King of the High Cs". He scored another major triumph in Rome on 20 November 1969 when he sang in I Lombardi opposite Renata Scotto. This was recorded on a private label and widely distributed, as were various recordings of his I Capuleti e i Montecchi, usually with Aragall. Early commercial recordings included a recital of Donizetti (the aria from Don Sebastiano were particularly highly regarded) and Verdi arias, as well as a complete L'elisir d'amore with Sutherland.

His major breakthrough in the United States came on 17 February 1972, in a production of La fille du régiment at New York's Metropolitan Opera, in which he drove the crowd into a frenzy with his nine effortless high Cs in the signature aria. He achieved a record seventeen curtain calls. Pavarotti sang his international recital début at William Jewell College in Liberty, Missouri, on 1 February 1973, as part of the college's Fine Arts Program, now known as the Harriman–Jewell Series. Perspiring due to nerves and a lingering cold, the tenor clutched a handkerchief throughout the début. The prop became a signature part of his solo performances. He began to give frequent television performances, starting with his performances as Rodolfo (La bohème) in the first Live from the Met telecast in March 1977, which attracted one of the largest audiences ever for a televised opera. He won many Grammy awards and platinum and gold discs for his performances. In addition to the previously listed titles, his La favorite with Fiorenza Cossotto and his I puritani (1975) with Sutherland stand out.

In 1976, Pavarotti debuted at the Salzburg Festival, appearing in a solo recital on 31 July, accompanied by pianist Leone Magiera. Pavarotti returned to the festival in 1978 with a recital and as the Italian singer in Der Rosenkavalier in 1983 with Idomeneo, and both in 1985 and 1988 with solo recitals. In 1979, he was profiled in a cover story in the weekly magazine Time. That same year saw Pavarotti's return to the Vienna State Opera after an absence of fourteen years. With Herbert von Karajan conducting, Pavarotti sang Manrico in Il trovatore. In 1978, he appeared in a solo recital on Live from Lincoln Center.

Career: 1980s–1990s
At the beginning of the 1980s, he set up The Pavarotti International Voice Competition for young singers, performing with the winners in 1982 in excerpts of La bohème and L'elisir d'amore. The second competition, in 1986, staged excerpts of La bohème and Un ballo in maschera. To celebrate the 25th anniversary of his career, he brought the winners of the competition to Italy for gala performances of La bohème in Modena and Genoa, and then to China where they staged performances of La bohème in Beijing (Peking). To conclude the visit, Pavarotti performed the inaugural concert in the Great Hall of the People before 10,000 people, receiving a standing ovation for nine effortless high Cs. The third competition in 1989 again staged performances of L'elisir d'amore and Un ballo in maschera. The winners of the fifth competition accompanied Pavarotti in performances in Philadelphia in 1997.

In the mid-1980s, Pavarotti returned to two opera houses that had provided him with important breakthroughs, the Vienna State Opera and La Scala. Vienna saw Pavarotti as Rodolfo in La bohème with Carlos Kleiber conducting and again Mirella Freni was Mimi; as Nemorino in L'elisir d'amore; as Radames in Aida conducted by Lorin Maazel; as Rodolfo in Luisa Miller; and as Gustavo in Un ballo in maschera conducted by Claudio Abbado. In 1996, Pavarotti appeared for the last time at the Staatsoper in Andrea Chénier.  Throughout the 1980s and 90s, promoters Tibor Rudas and Harvey Goldsmith booked Pavarotti into increasingly larger venues.

In 1985, Pavarotti sang Radames at La Scala opposite Maria Chiara in a Luca Ronconi production conducted by Maazel, recorded on video. His performance of the aria "Celeste Aida" received a two-minute ovation on the opening night. He was reunited with Mirella Freni for the San Francisco Opera production of La bohème in 1988, also recorded on video. In 1992, La Scala saw Pavarotti in a new Zeffirelli production of Don Carlos, conducted by Riccardo Muti. Pavarotti's performance was heavily criticised by some observers and booed by parts of the audience.

Pavarotti became even better known throughout the world in 1990 when his rendition of the aria "Nessun dorma" from Giacomo Puccini's Turandot was taken as the theme song of BBC's coverage of the 1990 FIFA World Cup in Italy. The aria achieved pop status, became the World Cup soundtrack, and it remained his trademark song. This was followed by the first Three Tenors concert, held on the eve of the 1990 FIFA World Cup Final at the ancient Baths of Caracalla in Rome with fellow tenors Plácido Domingo and José Carreras and conductor Zubin Mehta. The performance for the World Cup closing concert captivated a global audience, and it became the biggest selling classical record of all time. A highlight of the concert, in which Pavarotti sang the opening verses using extended vocal runs for di Capua's "O Sole Mio" and which was in turn perfectly repeated note-for-note by Domingo and Carreras to the delight of the audience. The recorded album sold millions of copies, and the first Three Tenors recording became the best-selling classical album of all time. Throughout the 1990s, Pavarotti appeared in many well-attended outdoor concerts, including his televised concert in London's Hyde Park, which drew a record attendance of 150,000. In June 1993, more than 500,000 listeners gathered for his free performance on the Great Lawn of New York's Central Park, while millions more around the world watched on television. The following September, in the shadow of the Eiffel Tower in Paris, he sang for an estimated crowd of 300,000. Following on from the original 1990 concert, the Three Tenors concerts were held during the three subsequent FIFA World Cup Finals, in 1994 in Los Angeles, 1998 in Paris, and 2002 in Yokohama.

In September 1995, Pavarotti performed Schubert's Ave Maria along with Dolores O'Riordan; Diana, Princess of Wales, who attended the live performance, told O'Riordan that the song brought her to tears. In 1995, Pavarotti's friends, the singer Lara Saint Paul (as Lara Cariaggi) and her husband showman Pier Quinto Cariaggi, who had produced and organised Pavarotti's 1990 FIFA World Cup Celebration Concert at the PalaTrussardi in Milan, produced and wrote the television documentary The Best is Yet to Come, an extensive biography about the life of Pavarotti. Lara Saint Paul was the interviewer for the documentary with Pavarotti, who spoke candidly about his life and career.

Pavarotti's rise to stardom was not without occasional difficulties, however. He earned a reputation as "The King of Cancellations" by frequently backing out of performances, and his unreliable nature led to poor relationships with some opera houses. This was brought into focus in 1989 when Ardis Krainik of the Lyric Opera of Chicago severed the house's 15-year relationship with the tenor. Over an eight-year period, Pavarotti had cancelled 26 out of 41 scheduled appearances at the Lyric, and the decisive move by Krainik to ban him for life was well noted throughout the opera world, after the performer walked away from a season premiere less than two weeks before rehearsals began, saying pain from a sciatic nerve required two months of treatment. On 12 December 1998, he became the first (and, to date, only) opera singer to perform on Saturday Night Live, singing alongside Vanessa L. Williams. He also sang with U2 in the band's 1995 song "Miss Sarajevo" and with Mercedes Sosa in a big concert at the Boca Juniors arena La Bombonera in Buenos Aires, Argentina, in 1999. In 1998, Pavarotti was presented with the Grammy Legend Award.

Career: Early 2000s

In 2001, Pavarotti was acquitted in Italian court of a long standing dispute concerning his official country of residency and taxable earnings. Pavarotti long claimed Monte Carlo in the tax haven of Monaco as his official residence, but an Italian court in 1999 had rejected that claim by ruling that his Monaco address could not accommodate his entire family. In 2000 Pavarotti agreed to pay the Italian government more than $7.6 million in back taxes and penalties as a result of tax evasion charges that dated from 1989 to 1995. Pavarotti was subsequently fully acquitted by an Italian court of filing false tax returns in 2001.

On 13 December 2003, he married his second wife and former personal assistant, Nicoletta Mantovani (born 1969), with whom he already had another daughter, Alice. Alice's twin brother, Riccardo, was stillborn after complications in January 2003. At the time of his death in September 2007, he was survived by his wife, his four daughters, and one granddaughter.

In late 2003, he released his final compilation—and his first and only "crossover" album, Ti Adoro. Most of the 13 songs were written and produced by Michele Centonze, who had already helped produce the "Pavarotti & Friends" concerts between 1998 and 2000. The tenor described the album as a wedding gift to Nicoletta Mantovani. That same year he was made a Commander of Monaco's Order of Cultural Merit.

In 2004, one of Pavarotti's former managers, Herbert Breslin, published a book, The King & I. Seen by critics as bitter and sensationalistic, it is critical of the singer's acting (in opera), his inability to read music well and learn parts, and his personal conduct, although acknowledging their success together. In an interview in 2005 with Jeremy Paxman on the BBC, Pavarotti rejected the allegation that he could not read music, although he acknowledged he did not read orchestral scores.

He received an enormous number of awards and honours, including Kennedy Center Honors in 2001. He also holds two Guinness World Records: one for receiving the most curtain calls (165) and another for the best-selling classical album (Carreras Domingo Pavarotti in Concert by the Three Tenors; the latter record is thus shared by fellow tenors Plácido Domingo and José Carreras).

Final performances and health issues

Pavarotti began his farewell tour in 2004, at the age of 69, performing one last time in old and new locations, after more than four decades on the stage. On 13 March 2004, Pavarotti gave his last performance in an opera at the New York Metropolitan Opera, for which he received a long standing ovation for his role as the painter Mario Cavaradossi in Giacomo Puccini's Tosca. On 1 December 2004, he announced a 40-city farewell tour. Pavarotti and his manager, Terri Robson, commissioned impresario Harvey Goldsmith to produce the Worldwide Farewell Tour. His last full-scale performance was at the end of a two-month Australasian tour in Taiwan in December 2005.

In March 2005, Pavarotti underwent neck surgery to repair two vertebrae. In early 2006, he underwent further back surgery and contracted an infection while in the hospital in New York, forcing cancellation of concerts in the U.S., Canada, and the U.K.

On 10 February 2006, Pavarotti performed "Nessun dorma" at the 2006 Winter Olympics opening ceremony in Turin, Italy, at his final performance. In the last act of the opening ceremony, his performance received the longest and loudest ovation of the night from the international crowd. Leone Magiera, who directed the performance, revealed in his 2008 memoirs, Pavarotti Visto da Vicino, that the performance had been recorded weeks earlier. "The orchestra pretended to play for the audience, I pretended to conduct and Luciano pretended to sing. The effect was wonderful," he wrote. Pavarotti's manager, Terri Robson, said that the tenor had turned the Winter Olympic Committee's invitation down several times because it would have been impossible to sing late at night in the subzero conditions of Turin in February. The committee eventually persuaded him to take part by prerecording the song.

Death

While proceeding with an international "farewell tour", Pavarotti was diagnosed with pancreatic cancer in July 2006. The tenor fought back against the implications of this diagnosis, undergoing major abdominal surgery and making plans for the resumption and conclusion of his singing commitments, but he died at his home in Modena on 6 September 2007. After his death, his manager, Terri Robson, noted in a statement, "The Maestro fought a long, tough battle against the pancreatic cancer which eventually took his life. In fitting with the approach that characterised his life and work, he remained positive until finally succumbing to the last stages of his illness".

Pavarotti's funeral was held at Modena Cathedral. The then Prime Minister Romano Prodi and Kofi Annan attended. The Frecce Tricolori, the aerobatic demonstration team of the Italian Air Force, flew overhead, leaving green-white-red smoke trails. After a funeral procession through the centre of Modena, Pavarotti's coffin was taken the final  to Montale Rangone, a village part of Castelnuovo Rangone, and was interred in the Pavarotti family crypt. The funeral, in its entirety, was also telecast live on CNN. The Vienna State Opera and the Salzburg Festival Hall flew black flags in mourning. Tributes were published by many opera houses, such as London's Royal Opera House.

Other work

Film and television

Pavarotti's one venture into film was Yes, Giorgio (1982), a romantic comedy movie directed by Franklin J. Schaffner, in which he starred as the main character Giorgio Fini. The film was a critical and commercial failure, although it received an Academy Award nomination for Best Music, Original Song.

He can be seen to better advantage in Jean-Pierre Ponnelle's movie Rigoletto, an adaptation of the opera of the same name also released in 1982, or in his more than 20 live opera performances taped for television between 1978 and 1994, most of them with the Metropolitan Opera, and most available on DVD.

He received two Primetime Emmy Awards for his PBS variety specials Pavarotti in Philadelphia: La Boheme and Duke of Mantua, Rigoletto Great Performances.

Pavarotti, a 2019 documentary film about him, was directed by Ron Howard and produced with the cooperation of Pavarotti's estate using family archives, interviews and live music footage.

Humanitarianism

Pavarotti annually hosted the Pavarotti & Friends charity concerts in his home town of Modena Italy, joining with singers from all parts of the music industry, including B.B. King, Andrea Bocelli, Zucchero, Jon Bon Jovi, Bryan Adams, Bono, James Brown, Mariah Carey, Eric Clapton, Dolores O'Riordan, Sheryl Crow, Céline Dion, Anastacia, Elton John, Deep Purple, Meat Loaf, Queen, George Michael, Tracy Chapman, the Spice Girls, Sting and Barry White to raise money for several UN causes. Concerts were held for War Child, and victims of war and civil unrest in Bosnia, Guatemala, Kosovo and Iraq. After the war in Bosnia, he financed and established the Pavarotti Music Centre in the southern city of Mostar to offer Bosnia's artists the opportunity to develop their skills. For these contributions, the city of Sarajevo named him an honorary citizen in 2006.

He performed at benefit concerts to raise money for victims of tragedies such as the Spitak earthquake that killed 25,000 people in northern Armenia in December 1988, and sang Gounod's Ave Maria with legendary French pop music star and ethnic Armenian Charles Aznavour.

He was a close friend of Diana, Princess of Wales. They raised money for the elimination of land mines worldwide.

In 1998, he was appointed the United Nations Messenger of Peace, using his fame to raise awareness of UN issues, including the Millennium Development Goals, HIV/AIDS, child rights, urban slums and poverty.

In 1999, Pavarotti performed a charity benefit concert in Beirut, to mark Lebanon's re-emergence on the world stage after a brutal 15-year civil war. The largest concert held in Beirut since the end of the war, it was attended by 20,000 people who travelled from countries as distant as Saudi Arabia and Bulgaria. In 1999 he also hosted a charity benefit concert to build a school in Guatemala, for Guatemalan civil war orphans. It was named after him Centro Educativo Pavarotti. Now the foundation of nobel prize winner Rigoberta Menchú Tum is running the school.

In 2001, Pavarotti received the Nansen Medal from the UN High Commission for Refugees for his efforts raising money on behalf of refugees worldwide. Through benefit concerts and volunteer work, he has raised more than any other individual.
Also in 2001, Pavarotti was chosen one of that year's five recipients by the President and First Lady as an honoree for their lifetime achievements in the arts at the White House, followed by the Kennedy Center; the Kennedy Center Honors, He was surprised by the appearance of Secretary-General of the United Nations and that year's winner of the Nobel Peace Prize, Kofi Annan, who lauded him for his contribution to humankind. Six months prior, Pavarotti had held a large charity concert for Afghan refugees, particularly children in his home town of Modena, Italy.

Other honours he received include the "Freedom of London Award" and The Red Cross "Award for Services to Humanity", for his work in raising money for that organisation, and the 1998 "MusiCares Person of the Year", given to humanitarian heroes by the National Academy of Recording Arts and Sciences.

He was a National Patron of Delta Omicron, an international professional music fraternity.

Legacy and estate assignment
His first will was opened the day after his death; a second will was opened within the same month of September. He left an estate outside his native Modena (now a museum), a villa in Pesaro, his flat in Monte Carlo, and three flats in New York City.

Pavarotti's widow's lawyers, Giorgio Bernini and Anna Maria Bernini, and manager Terri Robson announced on 30 June 2008 that his family amicably settled his estate—€300 million ($474.2 million, including $15 million in U.S. assets). Pavarotti drafted two wills before his death: one divided his assets by Italian law, giving half to his second wife, Nicoletta Mantovani, and half to his four daughters; the second gave his U.S. holdings to Mantovani. The judge confirmed the compromise by the end of July 2008. However, a Pesaro public prosecutor, Massimo di Patria, investigated allegations that Pavarotti was not of sound mind when he signed the will. Pavarotti's estate has been settled "fairly", a lawyer for Mantovani said in statements after reports of a dispute between her and his three daughters from his first marriage.

He posthumously received the Italy-USA Foundation's America Award in 2013 and the Brit Award for Outstanding Contribution to Music in 2014.

Selected discography

In addition to his very large discography of opera performances Pavarotti also made many classical crossover and pop recordings, the Pavarotti & Friends series of concerts and, for Decca, a series of studio recital albums: first six albums of opera arias and then, from 1979, six albums of Italian song.

Studio recital albums
 Favourite Italian Arias – Arias from La Bohème, Tosca and Rigoletto. Orchestra of the Royal Opera House, Covent Garden Edward Downes Decca Records 1966
 Arias by Verdi & Donizetti – Arias from Luisa Miller, I due Foscari, Un ballo in maschera, Macbeth, Lucia di Lammermoor, Il duca d’Alba, La favorita and Don Sebastiano (with the Wiener Opernorchester under Edward Downes, 1968).
 Tenor Arias from Italian Opera – Arias from Guglielmo Tell, I puritani, Il trovatore, L'arlesiana, La bohème, Mefistofele, Don Pasquale, La Gioconda and Giuseppe Pietri's :it:Maristella. Luciano Pavarotti tenor with Arleen Auger soprano. Leone Magiera (piano) Wiener Opernorchester and choir. Ambrosian Singers New Philharmonia Orchestra Nicola Rescigno 1971
 The World's Favourite Tenor Arias – Tosca, Carmen, Aida, Faust, Pagliacci, Martha. Royal Philharmonic Orchestra. Wiener Volksoper Orchester. Leone Magiera. New Philharmonia Orchestra Richard Bonynge 1973
 Pavarotti in Concert – Arias and songs by Bononcini, Handel, Alessandro Scarlatti, Bellini, Tosti, Respighi, Rossini. Orchestra del Teatro Comunale di Bologna. Richard Bonynge. 1973
 O Holy Night – Songs and carols by Adam, Stradella, Franck, Mercadante, Schubert, Bach (arranged Gounod), Bizet, Berlioz, Pietro Yon, Alois Melichar. Wandsworth School Boys' Choir. London Voices. National Philharmonic Orchestra, Kurt Herbert Adler 1976
 O Sole Mio – Favourite Neapolitan Songs 13 songs by Eduardo di Capua: O sole mio Francesco Paolo Tosti: 'A vucchella, Enrico Cannio: O surdato 'nnammurato, :it:Salvatore Gambardella: O marenariello, Traditional: Fenesta vascia, Tosti: A Marechiare, Ernesto de Curtis: Torna a Surriento, Gaetano Errico Pennino: Pecchè?, Vincenzo d'Annibale: O paese d' 'o sole, Ernesto Tagliaferri: Piscatore 'e Pusilleco, Curtis: :it:Tu ca nun chiagne, Capua: Maria, Mari, Luigi Denza: Funiculì funiculà. Orchestra del Teatro Comunale di Bologna Anton Guadagno National Philharmonic Orchestra :it:Giancarlo Chiaramello 1979
 Verismo – Arias from Fedora, Mefistofele, Adriana Lecouvreur, Iris, L'Africaine, Werther, La fanciulla del West, Manon Lescaut, Andrea Chénier. National Philharmonic Orchestra Oliviero de Fabritiis (Riccardo Chailly for Andrea Chénier arias) 1979
 Mattinata – 14 songs by Caldara, formerly attrib. Pergolesi, probably by Vincenzo Ciampi: Tre giorni son che Nina, Bellini, Tommaso Giordani, Rossini, Gluck, Tosti, Donizetti, Leoncavallo, Beethoven and Francesco Durante. Philharmonia Orchestra Piero Gamba National Philharmonic Orchestra. Antonio Tonini (conductor) 1983
 Mamma – songs by Cesare Andrea Bixio, Ernesto de Curtis, Arturo Buzzi-Peccia, Stanislao Gastaldon, Cesare Cesarini, A. Walter Kramer, Carlo Innocenzi, Giovanni D'Anzi, Eldo di Lazzaro, Vincenzo De Crescenzo, Domenico Martuzzi, Aniello Califano, Colombino Arona. Arranged and conducted by Henry Mancini, 1984.
 Passione – 12 songs by Ernesto Tagliaferri, Paolo Tosti, :it:Pasquale Mario Costa, Teodoro Cottrau, :it:Evemero Nardella, Rodolfo Falvo, De Curtis, Di Capua, E. A. Mario, Gaetano Lama and Salvatore Cardillo. Orchestra del Teatro Comunale di Bologna. Giancarlo Chiaramello 1985
 Volare – 16 songs by Domenico Modugno, Luigi Denza, Cesare Andrea Bixio, Gabriele Sibella, Giovanni D'Anzi, Michael John Bonagura, Edoardo Mascheroni, Ernesto De Curtis, Ermenegildo Ruccione, Pietro Mascagni, Guido Maria Ferilli. arranged and conducted by Henry Mancini 1987
 Ti Adoro – songs by Romano Musumarra, Carlo Mioli, Ornella D'Urbano, Michele Centonze, Andrea Bellantani, Daniel Vuletic, Veris Giannetti, Nino Rota/Elsa Morante, Edoardo Bennato, Hans Zimmer/Gavin Greenaway/Jeffrey Pescetto, Lucio Dalla. Royal Philharmonic Orchestra Orchestra di Roma. Bulgarian Symphony Orchestra. Romano Musumarra Giancarlo Chiaramello, 2000

Selected videography
 Mozart: Idomeneo (1982), Deutsche Grammophon DVD, 00440-073-4234, 2006
 The Metropolitan Opera Centennial Gala (1983), Deutsche Grammophon DVD, 00440-073-4538, 2009
 The Metropolitan Opera Gala 1991, Deutsche Grammophon DVD, 00440-073-4582, 2010

Awards and honors

Grammy Awards 
The Grammy Awards are awarded annually by the National Academy of Recording Arts and Sciences.

|-
|1979
|"Luciano Pavarotti – Hits From Lincoln Center"
|Best Classical Vocal Solo
|
|-
|1980
|Luciano Pavarotti & the Bologna Orchestra for O Sole Mio – Favorite Neapolitan Songs
|Best Classical Vocal Solo
|
|-
|1982
|Marilyn Horne, Luciano Pavarotti, Joan Sutherland, Richard Bonynge (conductor)  & the New York City Opera Orchestra for Live From Lincoln Center – Sutherland/Horne/Pavarotti
|Best Classical Vocal Solo
|
|-
| rowspan="3"|1989
| Luciano Pavarotti, Emerson Buckley (conductor)  & the Symphony Orchestra of Amelia Romangna for Luciano Pavarotti in Concert
|Best Classical Vocal Solo
|
|-
| Bellini: Norma
| rowspan="2"|Best Opera Recording
|
|-
| Mozart: Idomeneo 
|
|-
|1991
| José Carreras, Plácido Domingo, Luciano Pavarotti, Zubin Mehta (conductor) & the Orchestra Del Maggio Musicale for Carreras, Domingo, Pavarotti in Concert
|Best Classical Vocal Solo
|
|-
|rowspan="2"|1995
| rowspan="2"|José Carreras, Plácido Domingo and Luciano Pavarotti with Zubin Mehta – The Three Tenors in Concert 1994 
| Best Pop Vocal Album
|
|-
| Album of the Year
|
|-
|1997
|Frank Sinatra and Luciano Pavarotti – "My Way"
|Best Pop Collaboration with Vocals
|
|-
| rowspan="2"|1998
| rowspan="2"|Luciano Pavarotti
|MusiCares Person of the Year
|
|-
| |Grammy Legend Award
|
|-
|}

Kennedy Center honors 

|-
| 2001
| Himself
| Kennedy Center Honors
|
|-
|}

See also 

 List of best-selling music artists
 Pavarotti & Friends for the Children of Bosnia
 Pavarotti & Friends for the Children of Liberia
 Pavarotti & Friends for Guatemala and Kosovo
 Centro Educativo Pavarotti
 Pavarotti, a 2019 documentary film by Ron Howard

References

External links

 Official website
 Casamuseo Luciano Pavarotti – Home in Modena, now a museum
 
 Discography (Capon's Lists of Opera Recordings)
 
 Pavarotti Video Biography by National Italian American Foundation NIAF

 
1935 births
2007 deaths
20th-century Italian  male opera singers
Burials in Emilia-Romagna
Commanders of the Order of Cultural Merit (Monaco)
Deaths from cancer in Emilia-Romagna
Deaths from pancreatic cancer
Grammy Award winners
Grammy Legend Award winners
Italian expatriates in Monaco
Italian operatic tenors
Italian philanthropists
Italian Roman Catholics
Kennedy Center honorees
London Records artists
Musicians from Modena
Performing arts pages with videographic documentation
Primetime Emmy Award winners
Rocket Records artists
The Three Tenors
Nansen Refugee Award laureates